DZTC (828 AM) Radyo Pilipino is a radio station owned and operated by Radyo Pilipino Media Group through its licensee Radyo Pilipino Corporation. It serves as the flagship station of the Radyo Pilipino network. The station's studios and transmitter are located at RCP Broadcasting Center, Mcarthur Highway, Brgy. San Nicolas, Tarlac City. This station operates daily from 4:00 AM to 8:30 PM.

History
DZTC commenced full operation in 1965 under ownership of Nation Broadcasting Corporation, owned by the Yabut Family. It was the second radio station established in Tarlac province after DZXT-AM of Filipinas Broadcasting Network. On September 1981, Radyo Pilipino Corporation acquired the station, with Eli Garcia and Francis Cardona managing the station. Its studios were located at the 4th Floor of Mariposa Building along F. Tanedo St. In 1991, after the killer quake in Northern and Central Luzon, DZTC moved its studios to the Old White House along Ramos St., Brgy. San Vicente. In July 2008, the company changed its name from Radyo Pilipino Corp. to Radio Corporation of the Philippines.

References

Radio stations in Tarlac
News and talk radio stations in the Philippines
Radio stations established in 1965
1965 establishments in the Philippines